Thespidae is a family of Neotropical insects in the order Mantodea.  Following a major revision of this order in 2019, the old-world subfamilies Haaniinae and Hoplocoryphinae, previously placed here, have been upgraded to family level.

Subfamilies and genera
The following taxa are recognised in the family Thespidae:

See also
 List of mantis genera and species

References

External links
 
 
 Mantodea Species File

 
Mantodea families